Royal Air Cambodge  (known as 'Air Cambodge' from 1970 to 1975) was the flag carrier airline of Cambodia, headquartered in Phnom Penh.

History 
The company was founded in 1956. After the establishment of the Khmer Republic in 1970, the airline was re-named 'Air Cambodge'. It was reformed, under the original name 'Royal Air Cambodge', after the restoration of the monarchy and democracy in the early 1990s and the recovery of the economy in 1994. The airline's partner was Malaysia Airlines and aircraft was leased from them. The enterprise however was loss-making, totaling over 30 million US dollars. The decision to close its business was made partly because of a decrease of passengers numbers in the wake of the September 11 terrorist attacks, which brought the whole aviation industry as a whole in deep crisis. Royal Air Cambodge had to shut down on 16 October 2001. The Cambodian government later joined with Vietnam Airlines to set up the new national flag carrier Cambodia Angkor Air in 2009.

Former destinations
Royal Air Cambodge serves the following destinations:

Fleet

See also 

Air Vietnam
Royal Air Lao

References

Royal Air Cambodge went bankrupt
Cambodia's Royal Air Cambodge to stop all flights

External links

Royal Air Cambodge aircraft

Defunct airlines of Cambodia
Airlines established in 1956
Airlines disestablished in 2001
1956 establishments in Asia